Geophis tectus is a snake of the colubrid family. It is found in Panama.

References

Geophis
Snakes of North America
Reptiles of Panama
Endemic fauna of Panama
Reptiles described in 2008